Claudia Edith Anaya Mota (born 6 June 1979) is a Mexican politician from the Institutional Revolutionary Party (formerly from the Party of the Democratic Revolution). From 2009 to 2012 she served as Deputy of the LXI Legislature of the Mexican Congress representing Zacatecas.

References

1979 births
Living people
Politicians from Zacatecas
Women members of the Chamber of Deputies (Mexico)
Members of the Chamber of Deputies (Mexico) for Zacatecas
Party of the Democratic Revolution politicians
Institutional Revolutionary Party politicians
21st-century Mexican politicians
21st-century Mexican women politicians
Monterrey Institute of Technology and Higher Education alumni
Autonomous University of Zacatecas alumni
Members of the Senate of the Republic (Mexico) for Zacatecas
Women members of the Senate of the Republic (Mexico)
Deputies of the LXI Legislature of Mexico
Deputies of the LXIII Legislature of Mexico
Senators of the LXIV and LXV Legislatures of Mexico